Czorsztyn  (German: Schorstin) is a village in Poland, in Lesser Poland Voivodeship, Nowy Targ County. The village lies in Pieniny, the mountain range on the current Polish-Slovak border. It is famous for the ruins of a 14th-17th-century castle, which was the scene of the Kostka-Napierski Uprising in 1651.

Highlights
Czorsztyn gave its name to the man-made reservoir also known as Lake Czorsztyn, completed in 1994. The village along with its mountainous surroundings is a recreational destination with well developed tourist infrastructure: accommodations, pleasure-boats dock, and numerous marked hiking trails.

Gallery

See also
 Dunajec River Gorge
 Niedzica Castle
 Pieniny National Park (Poland)
 Trzy Korony massif

References

External links 

Villages in Nowy Targ County